Sporocyst can refer to:

 A structure in Ascosphaera fungi
 A lifecycle stage in two unrelated groups of species:
Apicomplexa parasites: see Apicomplexa lifecycle stages
Trematode flatworms: see Trematode lifecycle stages